
Thorley is a village and civil parish in East Hertfordshire district of Hertfordshire, England. The parish includes the hamlets of Thorley Street, Thorley Wash and Old Thorley, and is bordered at the north by the market town of Bishop's Stortford.

History
Thorley is listed in the Domesday book as "Torlei", belonging to Geoffrey de Mandeville, a notable Norman baron. During the reign of Edward the Confessor, Thorley Manor belonged to Earl Tostig.

Thorley is less than one mile north from Blounts Farm in the adjoining parish of High Wych, the place where, in 1966, the criminal Harry Roberts was found by police during a long manhunt after he had participated in the Shepherd's Bush murders of three London-based policemen. He was found in a barn hiding under straw. Roberts was familiar with the area as he had often visited it as a child with his mother.

Landmarks
Thorley Church, dedicated to St James the Great, is a Grade I listed building. It dates to the 13th century and includes a Norman font and a three-seat sedilia. The pulpit was designed by George Gilbert Scott. There is a one-thousand-year-old yew tree in the graveyard, which also has the grave of Daniel Defoe's sister. The graveyard is entered through a lychgate dating from the 1920s. The stocks and whipping post that stood in the graveyard until the late 20th century have now been moved to the Bishop's Stortford Museum. Samuel Horsley was rector of the Church from 1779 to 1782, following in the footsteps of his father John, who was rector from 1745 to 1777. From 1594 to 1610, the rector was Francis Burley, one of the translators of the King James Bible. A 16th-century Tudor barn in the adjoining farm was converted from pig barn to a church and community centre - called the St Barnabas Centre - in 1996 with the help of a £1 million endowment.

Thorley Wash nature reserve is a Site of Special Scientific Interest owned and managed by the Herts and Middlesex Wildlife Trust between the village and the Stort Navigation.

Amenities
Thorley has its own cricket club, Thorley C.C. The nearest local primary schools are Manor Fields Primary and Richard Whittington Primary, and Thorley Hill Primary which is on the same site as the Bishop's Stortford High School, all within and at the south of Bishops Stortford.

See also
The Hundred Parishes

References

External links 

 St James Church site
 Friends of St James
 Bishop's Stortford and Thorley history and guide
 British History online

Villages in Hertfordshire
Civil parishes in Hertfordshire
East Hertfordshire District